Peter Carl-Gustaf Gustavsson (born March 30, 1958 in Bollebygd, Sweden) is a retired Swedish ice hockey player. He played two games in the National Hockey League with the Colorado Rockies in the 1981–82 season. The rest of his career, which lasted from 1977 to 1994, was mainly spent with Västra Frölunda IF in Sweden.

Career statistics

Regular season and playoffs

External links

1958 births
Living people
Colorado Rockies (NHL) players
Fort Worth Texans players
Frölunda HC players
People from Bollebygd Municipality
Swedish expatriate ice hockey players in the United States
Swedish ice hockey left wingers
Undrafted National Hockey League players
Sportspeople from Västra Götaland County